The Breithorn (3,785 m) is a mountain of the Bernese Alps, located east of Blatten in the canton of Valais. It lies between the Bietschhorn and the Schinhorn, on the range separating the Lötschental (valley, north) from the main Rhone valley (south). Its summit is the tripoint between the Lötschental and two other smaller valleys: the Baltschiedertal and the valley of the Beichgletscher.

The Breithorn is one of the two mountains named Breithorn overlooking the Lötschental, the other being the Breithorn (Lauterbrunnen).

References

External links

 Lötschental Breithorn on Hikr

Mountains of the Alps
Alpine three-thousanders
Mountains of Switzerland
Mountains of Valais